Alexander Kartveli Batumi International Airport  is an airport located  south of Batumi, a city on the Black Sea coast and capital of Adjara, an autonomous republic in southwest Georgia. The airport is named after Alexander Kartveli, an aeronautical engineer and aviation pioneer.

Overview
Batumi is one of three international airports in operation in Georgia (along with Tbilisi International Airport serving the Georgian capital and David the Builder International Airport in Georgia's second largest city Kutaisi). The new airport terminal has been in operation since 26 May 2007.

Batumi International Airport has noted a significant growth in the number of passengers since its renovation carried out by TAV Airports Holding in 2007. In 2011, the airport handled 134,000 passengers, an increase of 51% over the previous year.

In 2019, it was decided to expand the terminal because the existing capacities were no longer sufficient. The work was completed in spring 2021.
The area has been doubled to 8000 square metres, which allows the handling of 1,200,000 passengers a year.
Part of the work was to expand the number of bus gates, check-in and passport control counters as well as the expansion of duty-free areas and the car park.
Additionally, the luggage handling area was partially expanded, where an automatic conveyor system was introduced and an additional one luggage carousel was installed.
A total of 17 million US-dollar were invested.

Airlines and destinations

Statistics

Most popular routes in summer 2021

See also
List of the busiest airports in the former USSR
List of airports in Georgia
Transport in Georgia

References

External links

Buildings and structures in Adjara
Airports in Georgia (country)